The province of Ogliastra was a former province in eastern Sardinia, Italy. Ogliastra was the most mountainous province in Sardinia. With only some 57,642 inhabitants, it was also the least populous province of Italy. The province had a population density of 31.08 inhabitants per square kilometer and the president of the province was Bruno Pilia. It corresponded roughly to the medieval Judicate of Agugliastra. The province of Ogliastra contained 23 comuni (plural; singular: comune), see the list of communes of the Province of Ogliastra.

In 2016 it was suppressed and all of its municipalities but one joined the Province of Nuoro. The municipality of Seui joined the newest Province of South Sardinia.

The province had two capitals, the towns and comuni Tortolì (the largest comune) and Lanusei. On 6 May 2012 the regional referendums of Sardinia took place regarding the abolition of certain provinces and a variety of other matters. The suggestion of reforming or abolishing certain provinces in Sardinia was approved by the Regional Council of Sardinia on 24 May 2012. Due to this, the province of Ogliastra was ordered to form a new administrative body or be abolished on 1 March 2013, but this expiry date for constitutional changes was extended to 1 July 2013. After the regional law number 15 of 28 June 2013, the province was allowed to maintain its functions, before it was eventually disbanded in 2016.

To the south it bordered the province of Cagliari and it borders the province of Nuoro in the north. Ogliastra was founded in 2001 when the number of Sardinian provinces was doubled. It contained the river Flumendosa and the lake of Basso Flumendosa, and it also contained large massif Gennargentu. Ogliastra took its name from the olive trees in the province, known as the olivastri. It was situated on the Tyrrhenian Sea.

Population
The largest municipalities in the province were:

Government

List of presidents of the province of Ogliastra

Provincial elections

See also
Arbatax

References

External links

Ogliastra official website

 
Ogliastra